Lag da Laus (Romansh) is a small lake within the municipality of Sumvitg in the Grisons, Switzerland.

There is no real tributary to the lake and the outflow will disappear in the underground after some distance as the area consists of landslide debris. The area of the landslide can easily be spotted from the Disentis direction.

Several hiking paths or mountain bike routes lead to the area. Some people swim on hot summer days although water temperature is less than 17 degrees Celsius. In the bottom of the valley a multi day hike leads along the river Rhine.

References 

Laus
Tourist attractions in Switzerland
Laus
LLagdaLaus
Sumvitg